30 Is a Dangerous Age, Cynthia is a 1968 British romantic comedy film directed by Joseph McGrath and starring  Dudley Moore.

Plot 
London jazz pianist and aspiring composer Rupert Street (Dudley Moore) is looking to have a 30th birthday to remember, marriage on the big day, but lacks a bride, and in the six weeks that remain, he has set himself the no less formidable additional target of writing a musical, all through fear of reaching that grand age having achieved nothing in life.  Luck comes Rupert's way in the form of the gorgeous but taken Louise (Suzy Kendall), a fellow boarder, whose attentions he pursues with all his goofy and inept might and main.  The inevitable bust-up with competing suitor Paul leaves Rupert with right arm in plaster and unable to play.

Seeing the need of freedom from distraction, Rupert departs for Dublin.  Industry and inspiration abound and Rupert returns to London triumphant having met his deadline.  Odds of achieving the other half of his plan look remote, though, as Louise has left for Birmingham with the persistent Paul and Rupert must go in pursuit if he is to be married in the few days remaining till his birthday.

Meanwhile, pressures from the production's major investor on Rupert's agent to lock up his creative work in a contract amendment send private eye Greenslade to Birmingham to hunt down the hunter.  Reunited by Greenslade on Rupert's birthday, the couple rush back to London for the opening, via the marriage registry, that is.

Cast 
 Dudley Moore as Rupert Street 
 Eddie Foy, Jr. as Oscar 
 Suzy Kendall as Louise Hammond
 John Bird as Herbert Greenslade
 Duncan Macrae as Jock McCue
 Patricia Routledge as Mrs. Woolley
 Peter Bayliss as Victor
 John Wells as Honorable Gavin Hopton
 Harry Towb as Mr. Woolley
 Jonathan Routh as Captain Gore-Taylor
  Ted Dicks, Jr. as Horst Cohen
 Nicky Henson as Paul
 Clive Dunn as Doctor
 Frank Thornton as Registrar
 Derek Farr as TV Announcer  
 Micheál MacLiammóir as Irish Storyteller

References

External links

 

1968 romantic comedy films
British romantic comedy films
Films directed by Joseph McGrath (film director)
Columbia Pictures films
1968 films
1960s English-language films
1960s British films